Harborside is an office complex in the Exchange Place district of  Jersey City, New Jersey located on the Hudson Waterfront. All the buildings are owned and managed by Veris Residential, with the exception of Harborside Plaza 10, which it sold but continues to manage.

Buildings
Harborside Plaza 1 is an eight-story class A office building. In 2007 a $12 million renovation was completed on the lobby which was designed by Beyer Blinder Belle.
Harborside Plazas 2 and 3 are adjoining buildings 12 stories tall. They are the oldest in the complex and have close to 1.5 million square feet of space. 
Harborside Plaza 4 is a proposed skyscraper. It will have 38 floors and 88,257 m2 of floor area.
Harborside Plaza 4A has office, retail, and parking components, and the property consists of a three-story class A office building built above a seven-story, 1,100-car parking garage, with a two-story retail component on the west side.
Harborside Plaza 5 is a 480-foot (146m) tall high-rise located at 160 Greene Street. It was completed in 2002 and has 34 floors. It is the 10th tallest building in Jersey City, and was designed by Grad Associates.
Harborside Plaza 7 was a planned mixed use tower that will be 59 floors and 800 feet (244m) tall located at Greene Street at Bay Street. The proposed building was designed by Kohn Pedersen Fox Associates. The space will instead became a new residential community, Jersey City Urby, featuring three towers comprising 2,358 residences overlooking the Manhattan skyline.
Harborside 8 is an approved 68-Story, 680 unit residential tower. The construction date has not been announced.
Harborside Plaza 10 is a waterfront office tower developed by Veris Residential for the Charles Schwab Corporation, in 2002.
URBY Tower 1 is a 70-story, 763 unit residential tower. Construction began on January 13, 2014 and was completed on February 28, 2017. It was designed by Dutch firm Concrete.
URBY Tower 2 is a planned residential tower as part of the URBY complex. Together with URBY 3, it will include 1,595 units.
URBY Tower 3 is a planned residential tower as part of the URBY complex. Together with URBY 2, it will include 1,595 units.

See also
Powerhouse Arts District, Jersey City
List of tallest buildings in Jersey City

References

External links

 

Office buildings completed in 1989
Skyscraper office buildings in Jersey City, New Jersey
Skyscrapers in Jersey City, New Jersey